The Council of South Tyrol is the provincial council of the autonomous province of South Tyrol (Bolzano) in northeast Italy.

As a legislature it is responsible for passing laws at the provincial level and enacting the budget. It also elects and controls the government of South Tyrol. The president (speaker) of the Landtag since 14 May 2021 is Rita Mattei of the Lega Salvini Alto Adige.

The functions of the Landtag were established in the autonomy agreement of 1971/72.

The seat of the Landtag is in the capital city of Bolzano (German: Bozen).

Composition
The Council is composed of 35 members. They were last elected on 21 October 2018. This chart shows the results of the election on 21 October 2018:

1 In these legislative periods, other parties were represented that are no longer represented in the current legislative period.

External links 
Website of the Council of South Tyrol

Landtag
Politics of South Tyrol
Unicameral legislatures
Bolzano